Bangladesh Bank is the central bank of Bangladesh and is a member of the Asian Clearing Union. It is fully owned by the Government of Bangladesh.

The bank is active in developing green banking and financial inclusion policy and is an important member of the Alliance for Financial Inclusion. Bangladesh Financial Intelligence Unit (BFIU), a department of Bangladesh Bank, has got the membership of Egmont Group of Financial Intelligence Units.

Bangladesh Bank is the first central bank in the world to introduce a dedicated hotline (16236) for people to complain about any banking-related problem. Moreover, the organisation is the first central bank in the world to issue a "Green Banking Policy". To acknowledge this contribution, then-governor Dr. Atiur Rahman was given the title 'Green Governor' at the 2012 United Nations Climate Change Conference, held at the Qatar National Convention Centre in Doha.

History

On 7 April 1972, after the Independence War and the eventual independence of Bangladesh, the Government of Bangladesh passed the  Bangladesh Bank Order , 1972 (P.O. No. 127 of 1972), reorganising the Dhaka branch of the State Bank of Pakistan as Bangladesh Bank, the country's central bank and apex regulatory body for the country's monetary and financial system.

The 1972 Mujib government pursued a pro-socialist agenda. In 1972, the government decided to nationalise all banks to channel funds to the public sector and to prioritise credit to those sectors that sought to reconstruct the war-torn country – mainly industry and agriculture. However, government control of the wrong sectors prevented these banks from functioning well. This was compounded by the fact that loans were handed out to the public sector without commercial considerations; banks had poor capital lease, provided poor customer service and lacked all market-based monetary instruments. Because loans were given out without commercial considerations, and because they took a long time to call a non-performing loan, and once they did, recovery under the erstwhile judicial system was so expensive, loan recovery was abysmally poor. While the government made a point of intervening everywhere, it did not set up a proper regulatory system to diagnose such problems and correct them. Hence, banking concepts like profitability and liquidity were alien to bank managers, and capital adequacy took a backseat.

In 1982, the first reform program was initiated, wherein the government denationalised two of the six nationalised commercial banks and permitted private local banks to compete in the banking sector. In 1986, a National Commission on Money, Banking and Credit was appointed to deal with the problems of the banking sector, and a number of steps were taken for the recovery targets for the nationalised commercial banks and development financial institutions and prohibiting defaulters from getting new loans. Yet the efficiency of the banking sector could not be improved.

The Financial Sector Adjustment Credit (FSAC) and Financial Sector Reform Programme (FSRP) were formed in 1990, upon contracts with the World Bank. These programs sought to remove government distortions and lessen the financial repression. Policies made use of the McKinnon-Shaw hypothesis, which stated that removing distortions augments efficiency in the credit market and increases competition. The policies therefore involved banks providing loans on a commercial basis, enhancing bank efficiency and limiting government control to monetary policy only. FSRP forced banks to have a minimum capital adequacy, to systematically classify loans and to implement modern computerised systems, including those that handle accounting. It forced the central bank to free up interest rates, revise financial laws and increase supervision in the credit market. The government also developed the capital market, which was also performing poorly.

FSRP expired in 1996. Afterwards, the Government of Bangladesh formed a Bank Reform Committee (BRC), whose recommendations were largely unaddressed by the then-government.

At present it has ten offices located at Motijheel, Sadarghat, Chittagong, Khulna, Bogra, Rajshahi, Sylhet, Barisal, Rangpur and Mymensingh in Bangladesh; total manpower stood at 5807 (officials 3981, subordinate staff 1826) as of 31 March 2015.

Branch offices

Functions
The Bangladesh Bank performs all the functions that a central bank in any country is expected to perform. Such functions include maintaining price stability through economic and monetary policy measures, managing the country's foreign exchange and gold reserve, and regulating the banking sector of the country. Like all other central banks, Bangladesh Bank is both the government's banker and the banker's bank, a "lender of last resort". Bangladesh Bank, like most other central banks, exercises a monopoly over the issue of currency and banknotes. Except for the one, two, and five taka notes and coins which are the responsibility of the Ministry of Finance of the Government of Bangladesh.
The major functional areas include :
 Formulation and implementation of monetary and credit policies.
 Regulation and supervision of banks and non-bank financial institutions, promotion and development of domestic financial markets.
 Management of the country's international reserves.
 Issuance of currency notes.
 Regulation and supervision of the payment system.
 Acting as banker to the government .
 Money laundering prevention.
 Collection and furnishing of credit information.
 Implementation of the Foreign Exchange Regulation Act.
 Managing a deposit insurance scheme .

Organisation

The bank's highest official is the governor (currently Abdur Rouf Talukder). His seat is in Motijheel, Dhaka. The governor chairs the board of directors. The executive staff, also headed by the governor, is responsible for the bank's day-to-day affairs.

Bangladesh Bank also has a number of departments under it, namely Debt Management, Law, and so on, each headed by one or more general managers. The Bank has 10 physical branches: Mymensingh, Motijheel, Sadarghat, Barisal, Khulna, Sylhet, Bogra, Rajshahi, Rangpur and Chittagong; each is headed by an executive director. Headquarters are located in the Bangladesh Bank Building in Motijheel, which has two general managers.

Hierarchy

The executive staff is responsible for daily affairs, and includes the governor and four deputy governors. Under the governors, there are executive directors and an economic advisor.

The general managers of the departments come under the executive directors, and are not part of the executive staff.

The four deputy governors are:

Ahmed Jamal,
Kazi Sayedur Rahman,
A.K.M. Sajedur Rahman Khan and
Abu Farah Md. Nasser
.

Board of directors
The board of directors consists of the bank's governor and eight other members. They are responsible for the policies undertaken by the bank.

Publications of Bangladesh Bank 
Bangladesh Bank publishes a range of periodical publications, research papers, and reports that contain monetary and banking developments, economic reviews, as well as various other statistical data. These include:
 Annual Report
 Bangladesh Bank Quarterly
 Monetary Policy Review
 CSR Initiatives in Banks
 BBTA Journal : Thoughts on Banking and Finance
 Annual Report on Green Banking
 Import Payments
 Financial Stability Assessment Report

Governors
Since its conception, the Bangladesh Bank has had 12 governors:

Bangladesh Bank Award
Bangladesh Bank Award is introduced in 2000.
The winners are:
 Rehman Sobhan (2000)
 Nurul Islam (2009)
 Mosharraf Hossain (2011)
 Muzaffar Ahmed and Swadesh Ranjan Bose (2013)
 Azizur Rahman Khan and Mahbub Hossain (2017)
 Wahiduddin Mahmud (2020)

BB in Social Media 
Bangladesh Bank is also available at Facebook with the name of "Bangladesh Bank-The Central Bank of Bangladesh".

See also

 Bangladesh Bank Taka Museum
 Bangladesh Bank robbery
 Economy of Bangladesh

References

External links
 BB Facebook Page

 Banks Information BD All Banks information in Bangladesh

Bangladesh
Economy of Bangladesh
Banks of Bangladesh
Banks of Bangladesh with Islamic banking services
Banks established in 1971
Bangladeshi companies established in 1971
Government agencies of Bangladesh
Organisations based in Motijheel